The Little Rebel is a 1914 American silent film produced by Gene Gauntier Feature Players and distributed by United Film Services (Warner's Features). It was directed by Sidney Olcott with Gene Gauntier and Jack J. Clark in the leading roles.

Cast
 Gene Gauntier - The Southern Girl
 Jack J. Clark - The Northern soldier
 Arthur Donaldson - The Southern Colonel

External links

The Little Rebel website dedicated to Sidney Olcott

1914 films
American silent short films
Films directed by Sidney Olcott
1914 drama films
Silent American drama films
American black-and-white films
1910s American films